Osgodby is a village and civil parish in the Scarborough 
district of North Yorkshire, England.

According to the 2011 UK census, Osgodby parish had a population of 1,248, an increase on the 2001 UK census figure of 1,186.

References

External links

Villages in North Yorkshire
Civil parishes in North Yorkshire
Beaches of North Yorkshire